Ranald MacDonald (1756–1832) was a Roman Catholic bishop who served as the Vicar Apostolic of the Highland District from 1819 to 1827, then the Vicar Apostolic of the Western District from 1827 to 1832.

Life
Born in Edinburgh in 1756, he was the eldest child of Ranald MacDonald, 7th tacksman of Fersit for Clan MacDonald of Keppoch. His mother Margaret MacDonald, daughter of Donald MacDonald, 2nd of Cranachan. He was educated at the Scots College, Douay, France. He was ordained a priest in 1782, and returned to his native country in that same year. He was first stationed at Glengairn, Aberdeenshire, from which he was transferred to Glengarry, and thence to Uist.

He was appointed the Vicar Apostolic of the Highland District and Titular Bishop of Arindela by the Holy See on 27 August 1819, with his residence at Lismore. He was consecrated at Edinburgh by Bishop Alexander Paterson on 25 February 1820.

In 1827, the Roman Catholic Church in Scotland was reorganised into three vicariate apostolics, the Eastern District (formerly the Lowland District), the Northern District (formerly the Highland District), and the Western District (created from territory of the other two districts). As a result of those changes, Bishop MacDonald became the Vicar Apostolic of the newly formed Western District on 13 February 1827.

MacDonald's scholarly attainments were of a high order. He was a man of polished manners and liberality of sentiment, and was beloved by persons of all persuasions. He did much by his work and conversation to soften down prejudices, and was ever ready to lend his aid in forwarding any scheme which had for its object the advancement of his fellow Highlanders.

He died in office at Fort William on 20 September 1832, aged 76, and was buried there.

During his time as bishop there came into his possession one of the Scotland's greatest ecclesiastical relics, the Last Chalice of Iona. Of fine beaten gold, upon which the marks of the hammer were quite distinct, its whole design indicated its great antiquity. It had passed from the possession of Sir Charles Lachlan Maclean, to that of Aeneas created by Charles II., Lord Macdonnell and Aros, and was gifted by Colonel Ranaldson Macdonell of Glengarry, to Bishop Ranald Macdonald, on whose death it came into the custody of his successor, Bishop Scott.

References

1756 births
1832 deaths
Apostolic vicars of Scotland
Clergy from Edinburgh
19th-century Roman Catholic bishops in Scotland
Ranald
Clan MacDonald of Keppoch
Scottish Roman Catholic bishops